The 2011 RAC Tourist Trophy was an auto racing event held at the Silverstone Circuit, Silverstone, England on 3–5 June, and was the fifth round of the 2011 FIA GT1 World Championship season. It was the FIA GT1 World Championship's second race held at the  Silverstone, although it is the first international racing series to use the brand new pit complex which was being built at the time of last years race. The event was supported by the FIA GT3 European Championship, GT4 European Cup and Lamborghini Blancpain Super Trofeo.

Background

After a collision between the two Swiss Racing Team Lamborghini's, the team decided to miss the Tourist Trophy as they could not repair the damage in time for the weekend. DKR Engineering returned to the grid with the one car after missing the Sachsenring round due to lack of spare parts available. Markus Palttala and Andreas Zuber return to the series. Palttala returns behind the wheel of a Ford GT replacing Yann Clairay in the No. 10 Belgian Racing machine, racing alongside Antoine Leclerc. He raced a full season for Marc VDS Racing Team in 2010. Zuber raced for Exim Bank Team China alongside Mike Hezemans, replacing Nick Catsburg. Zuber raced only the first two rounds in 2010 for Phoenix Racing / Carsport who also ran a Corvette similar to the one he used at Silverstone. Dimitri Enjalbert makes his GT1 début for DKR Engineering alongside French compatriot Michaël Rossi, replacing Matteo Bobbi.

Qualifying

Qualifying result
For qualifying, Driver 1 participates in the first and third sessions while Driver 2 participates in only the second session.  The fastest lap for each session is indicated with bold.

Races

Qualifying Race

Race result

Championship Race

Race result

References

External links
 Silverstone GT1 Race in Great Britain – FIA GT1 World Championship

RAC Tourist Trophy
RAC Tourist Trophy
RAC Tourist Trophy